= Tanker surfing =

Tanker surfing uses water-displacement caused by large cargo and tanker ships passing through a ship channel, which in turn causes waves to form and break on shoals and sandbars along the ship channel. The waves that are generated by the ships are used by surfers to ride for kilometers if the conditions are perfect. This type of surfing has been around since the 1960s, and only a select few surfers even tried or knew of tanker surfing. One of the pioneers of modern tanker surfing is Captain James Fulbright. Captain Fulbright has been studying tanker surfing for the past 13 years and has come up with some of the most accurate formulas for tanker surfing. Some of the most important parts of tanker surfing is understanding the seabed and the way the waves react to it. The tonnage of the ships needs to be around or more than 100,000 ton, speed of at least 10 knots (20 km/h) and the draft (hull) all cumulate into a perfect setup for surfable waves to form. The problem with tanker surfing is not knowing if a ship is going to produce a wave that is suitable for surfing. This will lead to a waiting game for all the right factors to play out.
